Lincoln Township is a township in Story County, Iowa, USA. At the 2000 census, its population was 856.

Geography
According to the USGS, it contains one cemetery: the Zearing Cemetery.

 U.S. Route 65 runs north–south through the township and County Road E18 runs east–west. County Road E18 was formerly Iowa Hwy 221 until it was decommissioned on July 1, 2003, and redesignated as a county road.

Story County maintains Dakins Lake, a  park located just north of Zearing in Lincoln Township. It has a  lake stocked with largemouth bass, bluegill, channel catfish, and crappie. It also has a small restored prairie and wooded areas.

References
 USGS Geographic Names Information System (GNIS)

External links
 US-Counties.com
 City-Data.com

Townships in Story County, Iowa
Townships in Iowa